Styrmir Snær Þrastarson (anglicised to Snaer Thrastarson; born 2 August 2001) is an Icelandic basketball player for the Þór Þorlákshöfn of the Úrvalsdeild karla. He plays for Icelandic national team. In 2021 he won the Icelandic championship with Þór Þorlákshöfn.

Playing career

Þór Þorlákshöfn
Styrmir started his senior team career with Þór Þorlákshöfn during the 2016–2017 season and won the Icelandic Super Cup in both 2016 and 2017. During the 2019–20 season, he was loaned to 1. deild karla club Hamar where he went on to average 10.2 points and 5.3 rebounds in 9 games.

Styrmir had his break out season for Þór in 2020–2021 where he was routinely assigned to guard the opponent's best player. On 5 March 2021, he scored a career high 32 points in a victory against Haukar. In 21 regular season games, he averaged 14.6 points, six rebounds and 3.3 assists per game. In the first round of the playoffs, Styrmir averaged 15.8 points, seven rebounds and five assists in Þorlákshöfn's 3–1 series win against Þór Akureyri. In the quarterfinals, he led Þór to a 3–2 series win against Stjarnan, averaging 17.4 points, 6.6 rebounds and 2.8 assists. He had three 20-plus points games in the series, including a 21-point performance in the fifth and deciding game. On 25 June 2021 he helped Þór win the national championship for the first time after it beat Keflavík 3–1 in the Úrvalsdeild finals. Following the season, he was named the Úrvalsdeild Young Player of the Year and to the Úrvalsdeild Domestic All-First Team.

Davidson College
In July 2021, Styrmir joined Davidson College. He played sparingly during his freshman season, appearing in 13 games, averaging 1.1 points in 3.3 minutes per game.

Return to Iceland
In October 2022, Styrmir left Davidson and rejoined Þór Þorlákshöfn.

National team career
After playing for Iceland's junior national teams, Styrmir was selected to the Icelandic senior national team for the first time in February 2021.

Awards and accomplishments

Club honours
Icelandic championship : 2021
Icelandic Super Cup (2): 2016, 2017

Individual awards
Úrvalsdeild Domestic All-First Team: 2021
Úrvalsdeild Young Player of the Year: 2021

Career statistics

College

|-
| style="text-align:left;"| 2021–22
| style="text-align:left;"| Davidson
| 13 || 0 || 3.3 || .400 || .333 || .500 || .7 || .3 || .0 || .1 || 1.1

References

External links
Davidson Wildcats bio

2001 births
Living people
Davidson Wildcats men's basketball players
Styrmir Snær Thrastarson
Styrmir Snær Thrastarson
Styrmir Snær Thrastarson
Shooting guards
Small forwards
Styrmir Snær Thrastarson